Mark Considine (born 1953) is an Australian political scientist, who specialises in public sector reform, and reforms of social services. Since 2018, he has been Provost of the University of Melbourne. He is a Fellow of the Academy of the Social Sciences in Australia and the Institute of Public Administration Australia.

Education 
Considine was educated at Monivae College in Hamilton, Victoria and at the University of Melbourne, obtaining a BA with a major in political science. He obtained a PhD in 1986 with a focus on the politics of insurance.

Career 
Considine has held positions at La Trobe University, the Philip Institute (now RMIT University) and the Department of Premier and Cabinet (Victoria) before joining the University of Melbourne Department of Political Science in 1987. He became Head of Department in 1996, and was then appointed to a professorial research post at Deakin University in 1997. He returned to the University of Melbourne in 2000, and in 2007 he was appointed Dean of the Faculty of Arts where he served for ten years. In 2015 his leadership in teaching and research was recognised with the award as Redmond Barry Distinguished Professor. He became provost of the university in 2018.  

He first came to prominence for work on public sector reform, managerialism and New Public Management. The other body of work for which he is well known internationally is his twenty-year longitudinal study of reforms to services for the unemployed in Australia, the UK and the Netherlands. Published in book form as Enterprising States, a number of influential journal articles also flowed from these studies. The first of these joint papers with Jenny M. Lewis won the American Society for Public Administration's Dimock Award in 2000. They won a second major international research award, the Kooiman Prize of 2013 for another paper derived from this study. 
Considine has also made significant contributions to the study of higher education. His book with Simon Marginson, The Enterprise University remains one of the most-cited studies of the Australian system. In 2001 the book won the American Educational Research Association's Outstanding Publication Award.

Selected publications 

 2018: ‘New Public Management and the Rule of Economic Incentives: Australian Welfare-to-Work from Job Market Signalling Perspective’, (with Siobhan O'Sullivan), Public Management Review, 20(8): 1186–1204.
 2015: Getting Welfare to Work: Frontline Governance in Australia, Britain and the Netherlands, (with Jenny M. Lewis, Siobhan O’Sullivan and Els Sol), Oxford University Press.
 2015: Democratic Accountability and International Human Development, (with Kamran Ali Afzal), Routledge, London. 
 2015: Contracting-out Welfare Services: International Comparisons (edited with Siobhan O’Sullivan), Wiley-Blackwell.
 2012: ‘Networks and Interactivity: Ten Years of street-level governance in the United Kingdom, the Netherlands and Australia’ (with Jenny M. Lewis), Public Management Review, Vol 14, No. 1, pp. 1–22.
 2009: Networks, Innovation and Public policy: Politicians, Bureaucrats and the Pathways to Change Inside Government (with Jenny M. Lewis and Damon Alexander), Palgrave Macmillan.
 2011: ‘Quasi-markets and Service delivery Flexibility Following a decade of Employment Assistance Reform in Australia’ (with Jenny M Lewis & Siobhan O’Sullivan), Journal of Social Policy, 40, 811–33.
 2008: The Theory and Practice of Local Governance and Economic Development (edited with Sylvain Giguere), Palgrave Macmillan, London.
 2007: ‘Innovation and innovators inside government: from institutions to networks’ (with Jenny M Lewis), Governance 20 (4), 581–607.
 2006: ‘Theorizing the University as a Cultural System: Distinctions, Identities, Emergencies’, Educational Theory, Vol 56, No 3, 255–270.
 2005: Making Public Policy: Institutions, Actors, Strategies, Polity, Cambridge.
 2002: ‘The End of the Line? Accountability and Governance in the Age of Networks, Contracts and Joined-up Services’, Governance, Vol 15, No 1. 
 2001: Enterprising States: The Public Management of Welfare-to-Work, Cambridge University Press.
 2000: The Enterprise University: Power, Strategy and Reinvention (with Simon Marginson), Cambridge University Press, 2000.
 1999: ‘Governance at Ground Level: The frontline Bureaucrat in the Age of Markets and Networks’ (with Jenny M. Lewis), Public Administration Review, 59, 6, 467–480.
 1998: Australian Politics in the Global Era (with Ann Capling and Michael Crozier), Addison-Wesley Longman.
 1997: Managerialism: The Great Debate (edited with Martin Painter), Melbourne University Press.  
 1994: Public Policy :  A Critical View, Macmillan.
 1992: Trials in Power: Cain, Kirner and Victoria 1982–92 (edited with Martin Painter), Melbourne University Press. 
 1992: Arguing About the Welfare State: The Australian Experience (with Peter Beilharz and Rob Watts), Allen and Unwin. 
 1991: The Politics of Reform: Worker's Compensation Policy from Woodhouse to WorkCare, Deakin University Press.
 1990: ‘Managerialism Strikes Out’, Australian Journal of Public Administration, June 1990, 166–178. 
 1988: ‘The Corporate Management Framework as Administrative Science:  A Critique’, Australian Journal of Public Administration, Vol. XLVII, No. 1, 4–18.

References 

1953 births
Living people
Australian political scientists
Academic staff of La Trobe University
University of Melbourne alumni
Academic staff of RMIT University
Australian university and college faculty deans
Academic staff of the University of Melbourne
Fellows of the Academy of the Social Sciences in Australia